Marah may refer to:
 Marah (plant) or manroot, a kind of wild cucumber
 Marah (band), an American rock band
 Marah (Bible), one of the locations which the Torah identifies as having been travelled through by the Israelites during the Exodus
 Micha Marah, Belgian popular singer
 Marah, a variant of the Irish name O'Meara

See also
Mara (disambiguation)
Marrah (disambiguation)
Mahra (disambiguation)